The 8th Alberta Legislative Assembly was in session from February 6, 1936, to February 16, 1940, with the membership of the assembly determined by the results of the 1935 Alberta general election held on August 22, 1935. The Legislature officially resumed on February 6, 1936, and continued until the ninth session was prorogued and dissolved on February 16, 1940, prior to the 1940 Alberta general election.

Alberta's sixth government was controlled by the majority Social Credit Party of Alberta for the first time, led by Premier William Aberhart. There was no Official Opposition in Alberta between 1926 and 1941 due to the Independent Movement which saw a majority of non-UFA candidates elected as independents. The Speaker was Nathan Eldon Tanner who would resign in 1937 and be replaced by Peter Dawson.

The previous government formed by United Farmers of Alberta would lose every seat in the 1935 election following the John Edward Brownlee sex scandal, and the upstart Social Credit dynasty would begin.

1937 Social Credit backbenchers' revolt

The Social Credit backbenchers' revolt was a rebellion against Premier William Aberhart by a group of backbench (not part of the cabinet) members of the Legislative Assembly (MLAs) from his Social Credit League during the third session. The dissidents were unhappy with Aberhart's failure to provide Albertans with Can$25 monthly dividends through social credit as he had promised before his 1935 election. When the government's 1937 budget made no move to implement the dividends, many MLAs revolted openly and threatened to defeat the government in a confidence vote.

The revolt took place in a period of turmoil for Aberhart and his government: besides the dissident backbenchers, half of the cabinet resigned or was fired over a period of less than a year. Aberhart also faced criticism for planning to attend the coronation of George VI at the province's expense and for stifling a recall attempt against him by the voters of his constituency.

After a stormy debate in which the survival of the government was called into question, a compromise was reached whereby Aberhart's government relinquished considerable power to a committee of backbenchers. This committee, dominated by insurgents, recruited two British social credit experts to come to Alberta and advise on the implementation of social credit. Among the experts' first moves was to require a loyalty pledge from Social Credit MLAs. Almost all signed, thus ending the crisis, though most of the legislation the experts proposed was ultimately disallowed or struck down as unconstitutional.

Bills

Reduction and Settlement of Debts Act
The Reduction and Settlement of Debts Act (Bill 15) was the first controversial bills passed during the 8th Legislature under the Social Credit government occurred during the second session in 1936. The Bill originally titled An Act to Provide for the Reduction and Settlement of Certain Indebtedness sought to eliminate compound interest on debts, make Foreclosures on farms and homes increasingly difficult, and restrict the ability for municipalities to seize land for property tax arrears. Lieutenant Governor William L. Walsh expressed concerns over the bills “ruthless” way that the Act proposed to deal with the rights of creditors. Walsh provided the Premier with three options: delay the bill until the next session, send the legislation for review to the Supreme Court of Alberta or do nothing in which case the Lieutenant Governor would likely withhold Royal Assent of the bill. The government chose to send the bill for review by the Supreme Court of Alberta and in February 1937, Justice Albert Ewing of the Supreme Court of Alberta ruled the Reduction and Settlement of Debts Act unconstitutional. The government appealed the decision but those appeals were unsuccessful.

Accurate News and Information Act

The Accurate News and Information Act, introduced as An Act to ensure the Publication of Accurate News and Information was a statute introduced by Provincial Treasurer Solon Earl Low and passed by the Legislative Assembly of Alberta in the fifth session of the Eighth Legislature on October 4, 1937, at the instigation of William Aberhart's Social Credit government. It would have required newspapers to print "clarifications" of stories that a committee of Social Credit legislators deemed inaccurate, and to reveal their sources on demand.

The act was a result of the stormy relationship between Aberhart and the press, which dated to before the 1935 election, in which the Social Credit League was elected to government. Virtually all of Alberta's newspapers—especially the Calgary Herald—were critical of Social Credit, as were a number of publications from elsewhere in Canada. Even the American media had greeted Aberhart's election with derision.

Though the act won easy passage through the Social Credit-dominated legislature, Lieutenant-Governor of Alberta John C. Bowen reserved royal assent until the Supreme Court of Canada evaluated the act's legality. In 1938's Reference re Alberta Statutes, the court found that it was unconstitutional, and it never became law.

Métis Population Betterment Act

The Métis Population Betterment Act (Bill 6) was a statute passed by the Legislative Assembly of Alberta in the seventh session in 1938 that created a committee of members of the Métis and the government to plot out lands for allocation to the Métis. Twelve areas were mapped out for this purpose, with the idea of creating ongoing cooperation between the Métis and Crown representatives toward the improvement of quality of life for the Métis. It came to light that certain lands given to the Métis were insufficient to create a living for the people placed there, and these settlements were rescinded. By 1960, only eight of the original lands were still in the hands of the Métis.

The Act came as a result of the findings of the Royal Commission on the Condition of the Halfbreed Population of the Province of Alberta (Ewing Commission) chaired by Justice Albert Ewing and included members James McCrie Douglas and Dr. Edward A. Brathwaite. The Commission recommended that Alberta's Métis should have land reservations for farming colonies/settlements, homes, and schools. Additionally, in recognition that the Métis were the original inhabitants of the proposed land allotments, the Commission acknowledged group rights and acknowledged that settlement Métis should have preference over nonresidents in harvesting fish, fur, and game.

The Recall Act
As part of Aberhart's mandate, the Social Credit government sought to bring recall petitions to Alberta. The Speech from the Throne on February 6, 1936 included a statement promising the government would introduce recall provisions for Members of the Legislative Assembly. On March 13, 1936, Provincial Secretary Ernest Manning introduced An Act providing for the Recall of Members of the Legislative Assembly (Bill 76) and subsequently passed third reading on April 3, 1936.

Recall did not last long in Alberta, by the fifth session in 1937 a recall petition had started against Premier William Aberhart and members of the opposition unsuccessfully introduced motions in the house to reduce the percentage of the electorate required to successfully recall a MLA. On September 30, 1937 backbench MLA Ernest Duke introduced An Act to repeal The Legislative Assembly (Recall) Act (Bill 11). The bill passed on October 5, 1937, and was retroactive to invalidate any previous recall activities, protecting Premier Aberhart from the active recall activities in his constituency.

Composition at election

References

Further reading

External links
Alberta Legislative Assembly
Legislative Assembly of Alberta Members Book
By-elections 1905 to present

08th Alberta Legislative Assembly